The Howe Baronetcy, of Cold Barwick (now Berwick St Leonard) in the County of Wiltshire, was created in the Baronetage of England on 20 June 1660 for George Grobham Howe, Member of Parliament for Hindon 1660–1667. His son Sir James Howe, 2nd Baronet was also MP for Hindon.

Howe baronets, of Cold Barwick (1660)
 Sir George Grobham Howe, 1st Baronet (died 26 September 1676)
 Sir James Howe, 2nd Baronet (–19 Jan 1736). The title was extinct on his death.

See also
 Howe baronets

Notes

Extinct baronetcies in the Baronetage of England
1660 establishments in England
1736 disestablishments in Great Britain